Liolaemus tacora, the Tacora lizard, is a species of lizard in the family Iguanidae or the family Liolaemidae. The species is endemic to Chile.

References

tacora
Lizards of South America
Reptiles of Chile
Endemic fauna of Chile
Reptiles described in 2016